"Paranoimia" is a song by English synth-pop group Art of Noise released in April 1986, from their second studio album In Visible Silence (1986). The song's better-known version was a version released as a single, featuring television character Max Headroom on vocals. This version was first featured on the 1986 album Re-Works of Art of Noise.

The 7-inch single features a monologue about Max Headroom being scared and unable to sleep (hence "Paranoimia", a portmanteau of "paranoia" and "insomnia"). The 12-inch has a completely different vocal with Headroom as a master of ceremonies, talking about the music and making a pun-laden introduction of the alleged band members: Peter O'Toole on trumpet (the absence of a trumpet in the song explained by O'Toole, notorious at one time for his drinking, "just having a rest between bars"), tennis player Martina Navratilova on  bassline (baseline), Cher on mic ("Are you OK, Mike?"), and the Pope on drums.

Track listing
The 12-inch single was also available on a one-sided cassette tape with the following track listing:
 
 "Paranoimia" (extended version) – 6:40
 "Paranoimia" (7” version) – 3:18
 "Why Me?" – 2:56
 "A Nation Rejects" – 2:57

Some later issues of the CD In Visible Silence, most notably the US version, include the single version in place of the original version, which did not include the Max Headroom vocals.

Charts

Weekly charts

Year-end charts

"Paranoimia '89"
In 1989, a remix by Ben Liebrand was released with a new video to promote The Best of The Art of Noise.

References

External links
 Paranoimia at Zang Tuum Tumb Discography
 

1986 singles
1986 songs
Art of Noise songs
China Records singles
Max Headroom
Song recordings produced by Gary Langan
Songs written by Anne Dudley